Lieutenant General William E. Ingram Jr. (born January 21, 1948) is a retired United States Army officer who served as the Director of the Army National Guard. He was the 20th individual and the third three-star general to lead the Army National Guard since 1948, when the office was established as Chief, Army Division, National Guard Bureau. In this assignment Ingram guided the formulation, development and implementation of all programs and policies affecting the Army National Guard, a force of more than 350,000 citizen soldiers in the 50 States, three Territories and the District of Columbia.

Ingram assumed the position and was promoted to lieutenant general on November 28, 2011 in a ceremony held at the Pentagon, which was presided over by Army Chief of Staff Raymond T. Odierno and National Guard Bureau Chief Craig R. McKinley. He retired in a ceremony presided over by Frank J. Grass at Joint Base Myer–Henderson Hall on January 14, 2014.

Military career
William Emmett Ingram Jr. was born in Elizabeth City, North Carolina on January 21, 1948. He enlisted as an Infantryman in the North Carolina Army National Guard in 1970 and received his commission in 1972 as a Distinguished Graduate of the North Carolina Military Academy's Officer Candidate School.

During his career, Ingram advanced through staff and command positions of increasing rank and responsibility, including Commander of 1st Battalion 119th Infantry and Commander of the 139th Support Detachment.

In 1997 Ingram deployed to the Balkans as Commander of Task Force Pershing, based at Camp Sava North, Slavonski Brod, Croatia. He then commanded the 60th Troop Command in Rocky Mount, North Carolina, before returning to the Balkans in 1999 to serve as Chief of Staff, United Nations Preventative Deployment (UNPREDEP), Skopje, Macedonia and Commander, Task Force Sabre, Camp Able Sentry, Petrovec, Macedonia.

General officer
In July 2001, Ingram was appointed Adjutant General of North Carolina, where he oversaw the largest mobilization of the North Carolina National Guard since World War II. While serving as the Adjutant General he also served as a member and subsequently as chairman of the Army Reserve Forces Policy Committee.

In October 2010, he was called to the Pentagon to serve as special assistant to the Army's Vice Chief of Staff. He served in this assignment until his November, 2011 appointment to succeed Raymond W. Carpenter as Director of the Army National Guard.

He retired in January, 2014, and was followed by Major General Judd H. Lyons, the Deputy Director, who was appointed Acting Director pending the selection of a permanent successor.  Ingram received a second award of the Army Distinguished Service Medal at his retirement ceremony.

Civilian career
In civilian life, from 1975 to 1988 Ingram was General Manager, Corporate Secretary and Treasurer of N.C. Green Oil Company, a petroleum marketing firm in Williamston.  He is a past director of the North Carolina Petroleum Marketers Association and the Williamston Rotary Club as well as a past director of the Martin County Chamber of Commerce and the Martin County Bureau of Travel and Tourism. General Ingram was also a director of Martin County's Committee of 100, an organization involved in local economic development efforts.

Family
Ingram is a native of coastal North Carolina. His wife Lil and he have three adult children and two granddaughters.  General Ingram's father, Major General William E. Ingram Sr., served as Adjutant General of North Carolina from 1977 To 1983.

Education
 1970 North Carolina State University, Bachelor of Science, Textile Chemistry, Raleigh, North Carolina
 1972 Infantry Officer Basic Course, Fort Benning, Georgia
 1978 Infantry Officer Advanced Course, Fort Benning, Georgia
 1982 Command and General Staff Officer Course, United States Army Command and General Staff College, by correspondence
 1983 United States Air Force Joint Firepower Control Course, United States Air Force Ground Operations School, Hurlburt Field, Florida
 1988 Terrorism in Low Intensity Conflict Course, John F. Kennedy Special Warfare Center and School, Fort Bragg, North Carolina
 1993 Reserve Components National Security Course, National Defense University, Naval Air Station Pensacola, Pensacola, Florida
 1997 United States Army War College, by correspondence
 2002 Black Sea Security Program, John F. Kennedy School of Government, Harvard University, Cambridge, Massachusetts
 2007 Executive Course on National and International Security, George Washington University, Washington, D.C.
 2010 University of North Carolina, Army Strategic Leadership Development Program-Intermediate, Chapel Hill, North Carolina

Assignments
 June 1972 – June 1973, Platoon Leader, Company A, 1st Battalion, 119th Infantry, Wilson, North Carolina
 June 1973 – August 1975, Platoon Leader (Mortar), Detachment 2, Company B (-), 1st Battalion, 119th Infantry, Woodland, North Carolina
 August 1975 – December 1976, Platoon Leader (Rifle), Detachment 2, Company B (-), 1st Battalion, 119th Infantry, Woodland, North Carolina
 December 1976 – February 1979, Executive Officer, Company B (-), 1st Battalion, 119th Infantry, Williamston, North Carolina
 February 1979 – November 1982, Commander, Company B (-), 1st Battalion, 119th Infantry, Williamston, North Carolina
 December 1982 – July 1984, S-3 Air, 1st Battalion, 119th Infantry, Ahoskie, North Carolina
 August 1984 – December 1985, S-4, 1st Battalion, 119th Infantry, Ahoskie, North Carolina
 January 1986 – March 1988, S-3, 1st Battalion, 119th Infantry, Ahoskie, North Carolina
 March 1988 – July 1991, Assistant S-3, 30th Infantry Brigade (Mechanized) (Separate), Clinton, North Carolina
 August 1991 – February 1995, Commander, 1st Battalion, 119th Infantry, Ahoskie, North Carolina
 February 1995 – April 1997, Rear Operations Officer, 139th Support Detachment, Morrisville, North Carolina
 May 1997 – August 1997, Commander, 139th Support Detachment, Morrisville, North Carolina
 August 1997 – February 1998, Commander, Task Force Pershing, Camp Sava North, Slavonski Brod, Croatia
 February 1998 – July 1998, Commander, 139th Support Detachment, Morrisville, North Carolina
 August 1998 – February 1999, Commander, 60th Troop Command, Rocky Mount, North Carolina
 February 1999 – May 1999, Chief of Staff, United Nations Preventative Deployment (UNPREDEP), Skopje, Macedonia
 May 1999 – August 1999, Commander, Task Force Sabre, Camp Able Sentry, Petrovec, Macedonia
 August 1999 – October 1999, Commander, 60th Troop Command, Rocky Mount, North Carolina
 October 1999 – July 2001, State Training Officer, Headquarters, State Area Regional Command, Raleigh, North Carolina
 July 2001 – September 2010, The Adjutant General, North Carolina, Joint Force Headquarters, Raleigh, North Carolina
 October 2010 – November 2011, Special Assistant to the Vice Chief of Staff, Army, Pentagon, Washington, District of Columbia
 November 2011 – January, 2014, Director, Army National Guard, Pentagon, Washington, District of Columbia

Awards and decorations

Additional accomplishments
 Order of Saint Maurice, National Infantry Association
 Order of the Long Leaf Pine, Governor of North Carolina

Effective dates of promotions

References

External links

 , December 7, 2011
 , April 12, 2012
 Role of Army National Guard, Washington Journal, C-Span, August 4, 2012
 , January 14, 2014

Living people
1948 births
Adjutants General of North Carolina
People from Elizabeth City, North Carolina
North Carolina State University alumni
United States Army Command and General Staff College alumni
United States Army War College alumni
Harvard Kennedy School alumni
United States Army personnel of the Kosovo War
Recipients of the Distinguished Service Medal (US Army)
Recipients of the Legion of Merit
United States Army generals
National Guard (United States) generals